La grilla ("The Grid") is a 1979 Mexican film. It was directed by Gustavo Alatriste.

External links
 

1979 films
Mexican comedy films
1970s Spanish-language films
Films directed by Gustavo Alatriste
1970s Mexican films